Back to the Beat may refer to:

 Back to the Beat (EP), an EP by Motion City Soundtrack
 Back to the Beat (Rob Swift album)